The Alliance Française of Wuhan ("Wuhan French Alliance") is a non-profit, non governmental cultural and educational association. Its mission is to promote the French language and Francophone cultures in Wuhan and Hubei, as well as intercultural exchanges; all within the context of the international network of the Alliance Française.

History

French language center

Alliance Française de Wuhan is based on three sites; the main center in Wuchang, the annex in Hankou and Hanyang.

Cultural and social events

Outreach Program

The public

Notes and references

External links
 Official website
 Wuhan University
 Alliance française in China

Educational institutions established in 2000
Alliance Française
China–France relations
Wuhan University
2000 establishments in China